Baghu is an area in the south of Iran to the west of Mogam in Kerman Province. Its name means "Garden" in Persian, and is the main city of the Al Obaidli Arab tribe.

Regions of Iran
Geography of Kerman Province